Saint David's Day ( or), or the Feast of Saint David, is the feast day of Saint David, the patron saint of Wales, and falls on 1 March, the date of Saint David's death in 589 AD.

Traditional festivities include wearing daffodils and leeks, recognized symbols of Wales and Saint David, respectively, eating traditional Welsh food including cawl and Welsh rarebit, and women wearing traditional Welsh dress. An increasing number of cities and towns across Wales, including Cardiff, Swansea, and Aberystwyth also put on parades throughout the day. 

The day is not a public holiday in Wales, which has prompted calls for a St David's Day to be a bank holiday in Wales and some organisations designating unofficial celebrations. 

The feast has been regularly celebrated since the canonisation of David in the 12th century by Pope Callixtus II.

Significance of the day

Saint David was born in Caerfai, southwest Wales into an aristocratic family. He was reportedly a scion of the royal house of Ceredigion, and founded a Celtic monastic community at Glyn Rhosyn (The Vale of Roses) on the western headland of Pembrokeshire at the spot where St Davids Cathedral stands today.

David's fame as a teacher and his asceticism spread among Celtic Christians, and he helped found about 1200 monasteries. His foundation at Glyn Rhosyn became an important Christian shrine, and the most important centre in Wales. The date of Saint David's death is believed to be 1 March 589. His final words to the community of monks were: "Brothers be ye constant. The yoke which with single mind ye have taken, bear ye to the end; and whatsoever ye have seen with me and heard, keep and fulfil."

For centuries, 3 March has been a national festival. Saint David was recognized as a national patron saint in the 12th century at the peak of Welsh resistance to the Normans. He was canonised by Pope Callixtus II in 1120. The 17th-century diarist Samuel Pepys noted how Welsh celebrations in London for Saint David's Day would spark wider counter-celebrations amongst their English neighbors: life-sized effigies of Welshmen were symbolically lynched, and by the 18th century the custom had arisen of confectioners producing "taffies"—gingerbread figures baked in the shape of a Welshman riding a goat—on Saint David's Day.

In the poem Armes Prydein (The Prophesy of Britain), composed in the early to mid-10th century, the anonymous author prophesies that the Cymry (the Welsh people) will unite and join an alliance of fellow-Celts to repel the Anglo-Saxons, under the banner of Saint David: A lluman glân Dewi a ddyrchafant ("And they will raise the pure banner of Dewi"). Although there were occasional Welsh uprisings in the Middle Ages, the country was briefly united by various Welsh princes before its conquest at different times, and it arguably had a very short period of independence during the rising of Owain Glyndŵr, but Wales as a whole was never an independent kingdom for long. Henry Tudor, 2nd Earl of Richmond, who was born in Pembroke Castle as a patrilineal descendant of the Tudor Dynasty of North Wales, became King Henry VII of England after his victory over Richard III at the Battle of Bosworth Field in 1485, to end the Wars of the Roses. Henry's green and white banner with a red dragon became a rallying point for Welsh patriotism with the memory of Saint David on his Feast Day. Henry was the first monarch of the House of Tudor, and during the reign of that dynasty, the royal coat of arms included the Welsh Dragon, a reference to the monarch's origin. The banner from Henry's victory was not adopted as the official Flag of Wales until 1959. The flag of Saint David, however, a golden cross on a black background, was not part of the symbolism of House of Tudor.

Proposals for a public holiday 

Unlike Saint Patrick's Day in Ireland, Saint David's Day is not a national holiday, though there is strong support for it becoming a bank holiday in Wales. In the past, schools have taken a half-day holiday, which continues in some parts of Wales. Saint David's Day is also celebrated in expatriate Welsh communities outside the UK. Cross-party support resulted in the National Assembly for Wales voting unanimously to make Saint David's Day a public holiday in 2000. A poll conducted for Saint David's Day in 2006 found that 87% of people in Wales wanted it to be a bank holiday, with 65% prepared to sacrifice a different bank holiday to achieve this. A petition in 2007 to make Saint David's Day a bank holiday was rejected by the office of the British Prime Minister Tony Blair. In 2022 Gwynedd County Council voted to make the day a paid public holiday for their staff.

Saint David's Day events

Cardiff

Around Wales each year, Saint David is commemorated in parades, the largest of which is in Cardiff. The parade is a non-military celebration of Welsh heritage and culture.

To mark Saint David's Day and their return from a six-month tour of Afghanistan, soldiers from the Royal Welsh Regiment provided the Changing of the Guard ceremony at Cardiff Castle's south gate on 27 and 28 February 2010.

On 1 March 2010, the seventh National Saint David's Day Parade occurred in Cardiff city centre. Celebrations included concerts, a parade, and a food festival. The food festival ran from 26 February with the third annual Really Welsh Food Festival in Queen Street, featuring all-Welsh produce. Following the parade, several Welsh entertainers performed and in the evening Cardiff Central Library provided free entertainment and food.

Other locations

Many towns now hold an annual parade through the town centre. Concerts are held in pubs, clubs, and other venues.
In the town of Colwyn Bay in north Wales, an annual parade through the town centre is now held with several hundred citizens and schoolchildren participating. Other events are centred on the parade.

Swansea inaugurated a "St David's Week" festival in 2009 with a range of musical, sporting, and cultural events held throughout the city to mark the national day. For 2018, the city followed St David's Day celebrations with a two-day food festival.

Disneyland Paris also organises yearly events to celebrate Saint David's Day, which includes a Welsh-themed week, fireworks, parades, and Disney characters dressed in traditional Welsh attire.

Washington, DC holds a St. David's Day congressional reception at the United States Capitol in honor of the First Minister of Wales' biannual visits.

The Los Angeles St. David's Day Festival – National Day of Wales is the largest annual event of its kind in the United States, encompassing an eisteddfod, Celtic marketplace, classes, and a concert.

Traditions

Children in Wales participate in school concerts or eisteddfodau, with recitation and singing as the main activities. Formerly, schoolchildren were given a half-day holiday. Officially this custom does not continue, although the practice can vary between schools. The younger girls sometimes wear traditional Welsh costumes to school. This costume includes a long woollen skirt, apron, white blouse, woollen shawl, and a Welsh hat.

Also, various Welsh Regiments of the British Army use aspects of Saint David's cross, Saint David himself, or songs of Saint David in their formalities during the celebrations. Many Welsh people wear one or both of the National symbols of Wales to celebrate St. David: the daffodil (a generic Welsh symbol) or the leek (Saint David's personal symbol) on this day. The leek arises when a troop of Welsh could distinguish each other from a troop of English enemy (some historical accounts indicate Saxon invading forces), dressed similarly, by wearing leeks.

The flag of Saint David often plays a central role in the celebrations and can be seen flying throughout Wales. Popular dishes traditionally eaten on Saint David's Day include cawl (soup), bara brith tea loaf, Welsh Cakes, Welsh lamb and Welsh rarebit.

References

External links

 
 The official site of the St. David's Day Parade in Cardiff
 BBC News – 1st St David's Day Parade in Cardiff (2004)
 
 Wales.com celebration resources